Emperor Jones is a small Austin, Texas based independent record label founded in 1995 by Craig Stewart. It has released albums by acts such as Alastair Galbraith, The American Analog Set, Roky Erickson, Thuja, ST37, The Mountain Goats, Stick Men with Ray Guns, Peter Jefferies, Pip Proud, Rusted Shut, Black Mayonnaise, Rahdunes, Shawn David McMillen, Grey Daturas, and Lord Fyre.

See also
 List of record labels

References

External links
 Official site

American independent record labels
Alternative rock record labels
Indie rock record labels
Record labels established in 1995
Companies based in Austin, Texas